William T. Leitch (1808–1885) was Mayor of Madison, Wisconsin from 1862 to 1865. His former house, known as the William T. Leitch House, is listed on the National Register of Historic Places. The house was also lived in by Madison Mayor Moses Ransom Doyon and U.S. Representative Nils P. Haugen.

Photo gallery

References

Mayors of Madison, Wisconsin
1808 births
1885 deaths
19th-century American politicians